Eoborus rotundus is a fossil species of air-breathing land snail, a terrestrial pulmonate gastropod mollusk in the family Strophocheilidae, from the Paleocene Itaboraí Basin, Brazil. Eoborus rotundus is a small species for the genus Eoborus, and the shell has a more rounded shape than average for the genus, a feature reflected in its species name.

References

Strophocheilidae
Paleocene gastropods